Acraea eugenia, the small smoky acraea , is a butterfly in the family Nymphalidae. It is found in Ghana (the Volta Region), Togo, western Nigeria, Cameroon, Equatorial Guinea, Angola, the Democratic Republic of the Congo (Tanganika) and Uganda.

Description

A. eugenia Karsch (53 b). Forewing diaphanous or somewhat smoky and entirely without markings. Hindwing above whitish or slightly yellowish to the discal dots, with basal and discal dots but without submarginal ones; marginal band somewhat smoky and at least 6 mm. in breadth. Togoland and Angola.-ochreata Grünb. Wings darker and more densely scaled; forewing with distinct transverse spot at the apex of the cell; hindwing from the base to beyond the middle scaled with yellow-brown on both surfaces. Spanish Guinea.

Biology
The habitat consists of open bushland near forests.

Adults are attracted to flowers.

Etymology
The name honours Empress Eugénie.

Taxonomy
It is a member of the Acraea terpsicore species group. But see also Pierre & Bernaud, 2014.

Acraea (group horta) Henning, 1993, Metamorphosis 4 (1): 8
Acraea (Acraea) (subgroup dammii)  Pierre & Bernaud, 2013, Butterflies of the World 39: 5, pl. 17, f. 1-3

References

External links

Die Gross-Schmetterlinge der Erde 13: Die Afrikanischen Tagfalter. Plate XIII 60 a

Butterflies described in 1893
eugenia
Butterflies of Africa